Aprata mackwoodii is a moth of the family Psychidae first described by Frederic Moore in 1883. It is found in Sri Lanka.

References

Moths of Asia
Moths described in 1883
Psychidae